Alba Nora Gúnera Osorio (May 1942 – 1 October 2021) was a Honduran politician and wife of General Juan Alberto Melgar, the Honduran military Head of State from 1975 to 1978. After being elected mayor of Tegucigalpa, she ran for presidency for the National Party in 1997 elections, but lost to Liberal Party nominee Carlos Roberto Flores. She served as the 6th Vice-President of the National Congress of Honduras during the 2010-2014 legislature.

References

1942 births
2021 deaths
Mayors of Tegucigalpa
First ladies of Honduras
Mayors of places in Honduras
National Party of Honduras politicians
Deputies of the National Congress of Honduras
Candidates for President of Honduras
21st-century Honduran women politicians
21st-century Honduran politicians